Salah Mohammad Massad (born on 8 September 1989) is a Jordanian former footballer who played as a goalkeeper.

References

External links 
 

1989 births
Living people
Jordanian footballers
Jordan international footballers
Association football goalkeepers
Footballers at the 2006 Asian Games
Sportspeople from Amman
Mansheyat Bani Hasan players
Al-Hussein SC (Irbid) players
Al-Ahli SC (Amman) players
Al-Baqa'a Club players
Al-Arabi (Jordan) players
Al-Yarmouk FC (Jordan) players
Asian Games competitors for Jordan